Adelaide Cabete (25 January 1867, Elvas – 14 September 1935), was a Portuguese feminist and republican. In 1909, with Ana de Castro Osorio she created the Republican League of Portuguese Women. She was the founder of the Portuguese women's organization, Conselho Nacional das Mulheres Portuguesas, and served as its president from 1914 to 1935.

Early life

Adelaide de Jesus Damas Brazão Cabete was born on 25 January 1867 in Alcáçova near Elvas in the Alentejo region of Portugal, the daughter of rural workers. Her father died when she was young and, in order to help her mother, she did not go to primary school. However, despite the difficulties, she learned to read and write. At the age of 18, she married Manuel Ramos Fernandes Cabete, who encouraged her to study. At the age of twenty-two, Cabete took the primary education exam, and in 1894 she completed her high school diploma with distinction. In 1895, the couple moved to Lisbon. She was only the third woman to receive a medical degree in Portugal and went on to open her own Gynaecology practice in Lisbon. She became a prominent voice in the support of maternity hospitals in Portugal, finally succeeding in 1932 when Portugal’s first maternity hospital was opened.

Activism
In 1907 Cabete became a freemason, joining the Grand Orient of Portugal Lodge. In 1909, together with Ana de Castro Osório, Carolina Beatriz Ângelo and other feminists who supported the Republican cause, she became one of the founders of the Republican League of Portuguese Women, which both sought the end of the Portuguese monarchy and advocated for women's emancipation and suffrage. As a militant republican, like her husband, she actively participated in the propaganda that preceded the regime change on 5 October 1910.

After the regime change, she worked to set up several women’s organizations, most notably the Conselho Nacional das Mulheres Portuguesas (National Council of Portuguese Women), of which she would be president from 1914 to her death in 1935. From 1920-29 she also edited the Council’s bulletin, Alma feminina. She helped organise the first two feminist congresses held in Portugal, in 1924 and 1928. She wrote many articles, primarily of a medical nature, but also in line with her social concerns. These included: "Role that the Study of Childcare, Feminine Hygiene, etc. must play in Domestic Education" (1913), and "Protection of Pregnant Women" (1924).  She also wrote feminist articles in Alma feminina and elsewhere. She advocated sex education for children in schools, and spoke out against bullfighting and against the use of war toys. At the first feminist congress in 1924 she presented a paper on "The situation of married women regarding the couple’s property". For the time, her ideas were very progressive.

In 1929, disillusioned with the authoritarian Estado Novo government, accompanied by her nephew, Cabete went to Portuguese Angola, where she worked to defend the rights of indigenous people and to provide medical treatment. In 1934 she was injured in a firearm accident and decided to return to Lisbon. There, with her health still poor, she suffered a fall and broke a leg. She died in Lisbon on 14 September 1935.

Legacy 
On 25th January 2023, Cabete was honoured through a Google Doodle.

References

 LOUSADA, Isabel, Perfil de Uma Pioneira: Adelaide Cabete (1867-1935), Editora Fonte da Palavra, Associação Cedro, Março de 2011, 

1867 births
1935 deaths
People from Elvas
Portuguese republicans
Portuguese suffragists
Portuguese feminists
Portuguese obstetricians
Portuguese women's rights activists